is a Japanese manga artist from Miyagi Prefecture. She has also published doujin under the name .

Works

Manga
 Magical Record Lyrical Nanoha Force
 Kiddy Girl-and Pure
 Shina Dark
 Holy Hearts!
 Sekai Seifuku Monogatari
 Harem Royale -When the Game Ends-
 Moto Kizoku Reijō de Mikon no Haha Desu ga, Musume-tachi ga Kawai Sugite Bōkenshagyō mo Ku ni Narimasen

Games
 Sakura Sakura

References

External links 
 Highway Star - personal homepage 
 

 
Living people
Japanese female comics artists
Women manga artists
Manga artists from Miyagi Prefecture
Year of birth missing (living people)